"Rewind" is a song by English rapper Devlin, featuring vocals from Diane Birch. The song was released as a Digital download on 24 January 2013 as the lead single from his second studio album A Moving Picture (2013). The song was written by Devlin, Diane Birch, Richard Duffy, Thomas Barnes, Peter Kelleher, Ben Kohn, Ruth-Anne Cunningham and produced by TMS. The song peaked to number 10 on the UK Singles Chart.

In the tune, Devlin reflects on himself, taking on more mature and sensitive themes of loss and personal darkness. He stated to 4music, "If I could rewind and have some people that I've lost - some friends and my relatives - see me be successful and grow into a young man, I would've loved them to have been here right now."

Music video
A music video to accompany the release of "Rewind" was first released onto YouTube on 12 December 2012 at a total length of three minutes and forty-three seconds.

Track listing

Credits and personnel
 Vocals – Devlin, Diane Birch
 Producer – TMS
 Lyrics – Devlin, Diane Birch, Thomas Barnes, Peter Keheller, Ben Kohn, Ruth-Anne Cunningham 
 Label – Island Records, Universal Music Group

Chart performance

Weekly charts

Release history

References

2013 singles
Devlin (rapper) songs
2013 songs
Songs written by RuthAnne
Island Records singles
Songs written by Ben Kohn
Songs written by Peter Kelleher (songwriter)
Songs written by Tom Barnes (songwriter)
Song recordings produced by TMS (production team)